This is a list of the mountains in Portugal, including the mountains with more than 1400 meters of elevation and with, at least, 100 meters of topographic prominence. 

Mountains and hills occupy most of the territory of Portugal.

References

See also
Geography of Portugal

 
Portugal
Mountains
Portugal